Phoenix Peak may refer to:
Phoenix Peak (Alaska)
Phoenix Peak (Antarctica)
Phoenix Peak (Colorado)

See also